Gummadi (Telugu: గుమ్మడి) is an Indian given name and surname.  It may refer to:
 Gummadi (actor) (1927–2010), Telugu film actor
 Gummadi Vittal Rao (born 1949), revolutionary Telugu balladeer and vocal Naxalite
 Jaya Krishna Gummadi (born 1974), Indian cinematographer

Indian surnames